|}

The Prix Penelope is a Group 3 flat horse race in France open to three-year-old thoroughbred fillies. It is run over a distance of 2,100 metres (about 1 mile and 2½ furlongs) at Saint-Cloud in April.

History
The event is named after two different horses called Penelope – a leading British broodmare foaled in 1798, and the winner of the Prix Royal foaled in 1820.

The Prix Penelope was established in 1905, and it was originally staged at Maisons-Laffitte. It was initially contested over 2,000 metres.

The race was abandoned throughout World War I, with no running from 1915 to 1919. It was held at Saint-Cloud in 1921, and moved there more permanently in 1927.

The Prix Penelope took place at Longchamp from 1940 to 1942, and switched to Maisons-Laffitte in 1943. It was extended to 2,100 metres in 1944. It returned to Saint-Cloud and reverted to 2,000 metres in 1946. It was restored to 2,100 metres in 1950.

The present race grading system was introduced in 1971, and the Prix Penelope was subsequently classed at Group 3 level.

The Prix Penelope can serve as a trial for the Prix de Diane. The last horse to win both events was Pawneese in 1976.

Records
Leading jockey (5 wins):
 George Stern – Muskerry (1905), Sais (1906), Roselys (1914), Samic (1921), Zariba (1922)
 Rae Johnstone – La Futaie (1940), Sylphide (1947), Corseira (1950), Arbele (1952), Sun Cap (1954)
 Thierry Jarnet – Madame Est Sortie (1988), Wemyss Bight (1993), Diamond Dance (1994), Tulipa (1996), La Sylphide (1999)

Leading trainer (9 wins):
 André Fabre – Trampoli (1992), Wemyss Bight (1993), Diamond Dance (1994), Muncie (1995), Tulipa (1996), Gagnoa (2008), Waldlerche (2012), Philomene (2021), Agave (2022)

Leading owner (10 wins):
 Marcel Boussac – Samic (1921), Zariba (1922), Diademe (1930), Canzoni (1939), Esmeralda (1942), Corseira (1950), Arbele (1952), Adarca (1953), Janiari (1956), Demia (1977)

Winners since 1981

Earlier winners

 1905: Muskerry
 1906: Sais
 1907: All Mine
 1908: Scarlet
 1909: Pierre Benite
 1910: Madeleine
 1911: La Becasse
 1912: Mongolie
 1913: Sweetness
 1914: Roselys
 1915–19: no race
 1920: Flowershop
 1921: Samic
 1922: Zariba
 1923: Fiasque
 1924: Isola Bella
 1925: Gandourah
 1926: Briseis
 1927: Carmelite
 1928: Tanais
 1929: Tour Eiffel
 1930: Diademe
 1931: Brulette
 1932: Incessu Patuit
 1933: Bipearl
 1934: Rarity
 1935: Clairvoyante
 1936: Royalebuchy
 1937: Sylvanire
 1938: Feerie
 1939: Canzoni
 1940: La Futaie
 1941: Longthanh
 1942: Esmeralda
 1943: Folle Nuit
 1944: Chambriere
 1945: Raita
 1946: Pirette
 1947: Sylphide
 1948: Princesse Kara
 1949: Cretonne
 1950: Corseira
 1951: Simonetta
 1952: Arbele
 1953: Adarca
 1954: Sun Cap
 1955: Senones
 1956: Janiari
 1957: Piriere
 1958: Dushka
 1959: Favreale / Ma Princesse
 1960: Timandra
 1961: Hermieres
 1962: Monade
 1963: Maintenon
 1964: Carolle II
 1965: Cassette
 1966: Kaliopi
 1967: Straight On
 1968: Roseliere
 1969: Saraca
 1970: Hether
 1971: Cigaline
 1972: Rescousse
 1973: Brave Ketty
 1974: Pale Ale
 1975: Petit Monstre
 1976: Pawneese
 1977: Demia
 1978: Tempus Fugit
 1979: Saloon
 1980: Good to Beat

See also
 List of French flat horse races

References

 France Galop / Racing Post:
 galop.courses-france.com:
 1905–1919, 1920–1949, 1950–1979, 1980–present
 france-galop.com – A Brief History: Prix Pénélope.
 galopp-sieger.de – Prix Penelope.
 ifhaonline.org – International Federation of Horseracing Authorities – Prix Penelope (2019).
 pedigreequery.com – Prix Penelope – Saint-Cloud.

Flat horse races for three-year-old fillies
Saint-Cloud Racecourse
Horse races in France
1905 establishments in France
Recurring sporting events established in 1905